Ozbek may refer to:

Özbek (disambiguation)
Uzbeks